"So Fly" is the debut single of 112 band member Slim from his debut album Love's Crazy. It features rapper Yung Joc and produced by Oddz N Endz. The song has reached #49 on the U.S. Billboard Hot 100.

Track listing
Digital download

 "So Fly" - 3:36 (feat. Yung Joc)

Remixes
On October 27, 2008, the main official remix was released and features new verses & vocals by Slim and new verses by R&B singer Faith Evans & Atlanta rapper Big Boi.

The single/video version that features Shawty Lo is the 2nd main official remix.

Another remix called the "East Coast Remix" featuring Jadakiss, Busta Rhymes and  Freeway was also released in 2008.

Charts

Weekly charts

Year-end charts

References

2008 debut singles
Yung Joc songs
Shawty Lo songs
2008 songs